Glažuta may refer to:

 Glažuta, Loški Potok, a settlement in the  Municipality of Loški Potok, Slovenia
 Svetli Dol, a settlement in the  Municipality of Štore, Slovenia, named Glažuta until 1955
 Glažuta (Sopota), a creek and tributary of the Sopota River in Slovenia
 Glažuta (Sotla), a creek and tributary of the Sotla River in Slovenia